Aleksei Kangaskolkka (born 29 October 1988) is a Finnish-Russian former footballer, who played as a forward.

Career
Kangaskolkka was born in Vyborg, USSR, where he grew up before moving to Finland with his mother and Ingrian Finnish stepfather at the age of eight. In 2004, he made his debut with MyPa in the Finnish top division Veikkausliiga at the young age of sixteen. In that same year he also went on trial with English club Manchester United. In his second year with IFK Mariehamn he had his most successful season yet when he became the second best goalscorer of the 2012 Veikkausliiga. After that Kangaskolkka felt that he wanted to try playing in another league and signed a one-year contract with Jönköpings Södra in the Swedish second tier. On 17 July 2013, he signed with Dutch side Heracles Almelo. In 2015, Kangaskolkka returned to Mariehamn. That year he won Finnish Cup. The next season he won Veikkausliiga, and in the 2017 season he became a top scorer of the league with 16 goals. At the end of the 2018 season, Kangaskolkka announced his retirement from professional football.

Personal life
Kangaskolkka has both Finnish and Russian citizenship and says that he feels equally Finnish and Russian. He speaks the Finnish language better and considers Tampere in Finland to be his home. But he also admits that he supports the Russia men's national ice hockey team when they play against the Finland men's national ice hockey team.

Career statistics

Honours 
MyPa
 Veikkausliiga: 2005

IFK Mariehamn
 Veikkausliiga: 2016
 Finnish Cup: 2015

Individual
Veikkausliiga Team of the Year: 2017

References

External links

 Swedish FA Profile
 
 Voetbal International profile 

Living people
1988 births
Association football forwards
Finnish footballers
Finland youth international footballers
Russian footballers
Russian people of Finnish descent
Finnish expatriate footballers
Veikkausliiga players
Myllykosken Pallo −47 players
Tampere United players
IFK Mariehamn players
Superettan players
Jönköpings Södra IF players
Eredivisie players
Heracles Almelo players
Expatriate footballers in Sweden
Russian-speaking Finns